Pal O' Mine is a 1924 drama-romance 6-reel film produced by Columbia Pictures. The film was directed by Edward Le Saint and written by Edith Kennedy. The film was released on March 1, 1924.

Production and release
The film was directed by Edward Le Saint, one of the earliest directors to work with Columbia Pictures. Edith Kennedy wrote the film's screenplay. It was theatrically released in North American cinemas on March 1, 1924.

References

Bibliography

External links
 

1924 short films
American silent short films
Films directed by Edward LeSaint
Lost American films
1924 romantic drama films
American romantic drama films
Columbia Pictures short films
American black-and-white films
1924 films
1920s American films
Silent romantic drama films
Silent American drama films